Ipil Airport (Cebuano: Tugpahanan sa Ipil, Chavacano: Aeropuerto de Ipil)   is an airport serving the general area of Ipil, the capital of the province of Zamboanga Sibugay in the Philippines.  It is the one of the 2 airport in the province other than Malangas Airfield. The airport is classified as a community airport by the Civil Aviation Authority of the Philippines, a body of the Department of Transportation that is responsible for the operations of not only this airport but also of all other airports in the Philippines except the major international airports.

Future expansion
A ninety-million peso expansion project was launched by the Philippine government in February 2009 to upgrade and improve the airport's facilities.  The project is divided into two stages, with the end result being a 1.2-kilometer runway with a taxiway, apron and terminal building, with the possibility of the runway being as long as two kilometers.  Once complete, the airport will be able to support small passenger and cargo planes, while at the same time serving as a reliever airport for Zamboanga International Airport in Zamboanga City.

References

See also
List of airports in the Philippines

Airports in the Philippines
Buildings and structures in Zamboanga Sibugay
Transportation in Mindanao